Ardro pod Velikim Trnom is a small settlement in the hills east of Krško in eastern Slovenia. The area is part of the traditional region of Lower Carniola. It is now included with the rest of the municipality in the Lower Sava Statistical Region.

Name
The name of the settlement was changed from Ardro to Ardro pod Velikim Trnom in 1953.

References

External links
Ardro pod Velikim Trnom on Geopedia

Populated places in the Municipality of Krško